Adrian Knup (born 2 July 1968) is a Swiss former professional football striker who played in the 1980s and 1990s.

He was capped 49 times and scored 26 goals for the Switzerland national team between 1989 and 1996, including three games at the 1994 FIFA World Cup. From 2009 to 2017 he worked as the head coach of the youth sector at FC Basel and was also the vice president of the club between 2012 and 2017.

Club career
Knup played his youth football with local team Basel. He advanced to their first team for their 1985–86 season and signed his first professional contract under manager Helmut Benthaus. After playing in one test match, Knup played his domestic league debut for the club in the home game at the St. Jakob Stadium on 19 April 1986 as Basel won 5–0 against Baden. In his first season Knup had just seven league appearances.

During their 1986–87 season Knup advanced and became a regular in the starting team. Knup was a typical No. 9 and was famed for the power he could get behind his headers. He scored his first league goal for his club in the first game of the season on 9 August 1986. It was the last goal of the away match against, but it could not help the team, as Basel were defeated 1–3 against Sion. In the following match one week later

Knup played three seasons with the club and received a call up to the Switzerland national team. But with Basel, apart from one title in the Uhrencup in 1986, he had no big successes. In their 1987–88 season his teammates included goalie Urs Suter, the defenders Peter Bernauer and Massimo Ceccaroni, the Scott Gordon Duffield Smith and two other Switzerland national team players Peter Nadig and Dominique Herr. Despite this personally strongly occupied team Basel were relegated to the Nationalliga B after the 1987–88 Nationalliga A season. One match in this season receives a particular mention, the away game on 29 November 1987 and Knup netted a hat-trick between the 37th and 71st minute as Basel won 4–0 against Zürich.

Following the relegation he left the team and joined FC Aarau in 1988. He spent only one season at Aarau and signed for FC Luzern in 1989 where he was an immediate success. In 1990, he was voted Luzern's Player of the Year. He was then signed by Bundesliga side VfB Stuttgart in 1992 where he played until 1994 when he signed for Karlsruher SC. He reached the 1995–96 DFB-Pokal final with Karlsruhe but they were beaten 1–0 by 1. FC Kaiserslautern. He then had a short spell with Galatasaray S.K. in Turkey before returning to Switzerland.

During the winter break of their 1996–97 season knup returned to his club of origin under manager Karl Engel. But Knup needed some six matches before he found the binding to his new teammates and then it came to being. He scored two goals at home against Grasshopper Club, another goal in the home match against Xamax and another two goals in the home match against Aarau.

Knup stayed with the club for another season before he retired from his active football career. Between the years 1982 to 1988 and again from 1996 to 1998 Knup played a total of 138 games for Basel scoring a total of 54 goals. exactly 100 of these games were in the Nationalliga A, eight in the Swiss Cup and 30 were friendly games. He scored 29 goals in the domestic league, four in the cup and the other 21 were scored during the test games.

International career
Knup played for the Switzerland national team between 1989 and 1996. He scored 26 goals in 49 games. Two of his goals came against Romania in a 4–1 win at the 1994 FIFA World Cup in the USA.

Personal life
After retirement from his playing career, Knup became a commentator for Swiss League matches. On 25 May 2007, he was given the job as a coach for the Switzerland national team but demissioned after UEFA Euro 2008.

At the FC Basel AGM in June 2009 Knup was elected into the club's board of directors under club president Gigi Oeri. From 2009 to 2012 he worked as the head coach for the club's the youth sector. At the AGM in 2012, Ms Oeri stood down and Bernard Heusler became the club chairman, Knup was elected as vice president of the club. He held this position until 2017. Knup, president Heusler, finance director Stephan Werthmüller, director of football Georg Heitz and marketing director René Kamm all stood downsold together and Heusler sold the clubs Holding AG to Benrhard Burgener.

Career statistics
Scores and results list Switzerland's goal tally first, score column indicates score after each Knup goal.

Honours
VfB Stuttgart
 DFL-Supercup: 1992

References

 Die ersten 125 Jahre. Publisher: Josef Zindel im Friedrich Reinhardt Verlag, Basel. 
 Verein "Basler Fussballarchiv" Homepage

External links

 

1968 births
Living people
People from Liestal
Association football forwards
Swiss men's footballers
FC Basel players
VfB Stuttgart players
Karlsruher SC players
Galatasaray S.K. footballers
1994 FIFA World Cup players
Switzerland international footballers
FC Luzern players
FC Aarau players
Swiss Super League players
Bundesliga players
Süper Lig players
Swiss expatriate footballers
Expatriate footballers in Germany
Swiss expatriate sportspeople in Germany
Expatriate footballers in Turkey
Swiss expatriate sportspeople in Turkey
FC Basel non-playing staff
Sportspeople from Basel-Landschaft